The North East Independent School District (commonly NEISD or North East ISD) is a school district located in San Antonio, Texas, United States. North East ISD serves the cities of Castle Hills, Hill Country Village, Hollywood Park, Windcrest, and portions of San Antonio, Balcones Heights, Terrell Hills, and Timberwood Park. North East ISD is the second largest school district serving the San Antonio area by student attendance, following Northside ISD.

Schools

High schools

The district's seven main high school campuses were named after nationally or internationally renowned persons until 2018, when Robert E. Lee High School was renamed Legacy of Educational Excellence High School (L.E.E. High School).

Secondary campuses
  Academy of Creative Education (ACE)

Magnet programs
North East offers seven magnet programs housed at four main campuses, and an additional program at the Perrin Central complex. Each of these programs operates with various levels of autonomy and integration with its primary campus.

Middle schools

All of the district's middle schools are named after Texas-renowned persons.
 Bradley Middle School
National Blue Ribbon School in 1986–87
 Bush Middle School
 Driscoll Middle School
National Blue Ribbon School in 1988–89
 Garner Middle School
 Harris Middle School
 Hill Middle School
 Krueger Middle School
 Interactive Media Applications at Krueger
 Krueger School of Applied Technologies
 Rencon
 Lopez Middle School
 Nimitz Middle School
 Tejeda Middle School
 White Middle School
 Wood Middle School
 Eisenhower Middle School
 Jackson Middle School

Elementary schools
The district's elementary schools are named in coordination with the neighborhood or community name. The year the school opened is in parentheses.

 Bulverde Creek (2005)
 Camelot (1969)
 Canyon Ridge (2005)
 Cibolo Green (2010)
 Clear Spring (1969)
 Coker (1954)
 Colonial Hills (1961)
 Dellview (1957)
 East Terrell Hills (1962)
 El Dorado (1973)
 Encino Park (1989)
 Fox Run (1990)
 Hardy Oak (2000)
 Harmony Hills (1963)
 Hidden Forest (1978)
National Blue Ribbon School in 2000–01 and 2007
 Huebner (1997)
 Jackson-Keller (1962)
 Larkspur (1966)
 Las Lomas (2012)
 Longs Creek (1997)
 Montgomery (1974)
 Northern Hills (1981)
 Northwood (1957)
 Oak Grove (1961)
 Oak Meadow (1991)
 Olmos (1956)
National Blue Ribbon School in 2000–01
 Redland Oaks (1989)
 Regency Place (1968)
 Ridgeview (1956)
 Roan Forest (2002)
2008 National Blue Ribbon School
 Royal Ridge (2002)
 Serna (1953)
 Stahl (1979)
 Steubing Ranch (2005)
 Stone Oak (1996)
 Thousand Oaks (1979)
 Tuscany Heights (2010)
 Vineyard Ranch (2012)
 Walzem (1960)
 Pre-K Academy at West Avenue (Repurposed to Pre-K school in 2019, original elementary opened 1964)
 Wetmore (2001)
 Wilderness Oak (2005)
 Wilshire (1957)
 Windcrest (1963)
 Woodstone (1978)
 Castle Hills (1951)

Student information

Demographics

Students by grade

Athletic facilities
In addition to on-campus facilities, the district owns and operates a number of sports venues.  Among these are two 11,000-seat football stadiums, Heroes Stadium and Comalander Stadium, the Josh Davis Natatorium, and baseball, soccer, and tennis facilities at the Blossom Athletic Center. The district signed a 50-year rent-free lease to operate Time Warner Cable Park on Wetmore Road from the City of San Antonio in 2015.

Shanley v. North East ISD 
North East ISD was the defendant in Shanley v. Northeast Independent School District, a Fifth Circuit Court of Appeals ruling which declared that North East ISD had an overly broad policy and the district's suspension of five students had interfered with their rights to free speech under the United States Constitution. North East had suspended five high school students for publishing an unapproved newsletter and then distributed it to students near campus before and after school hours. The NEISD school board declared the content, which included information about birth control and advocated for the review of marijuana laws, to be inappropriate and controversial. The Court found that public schools can limit the expression of its students when it materially and substantially interferes with school activities, or with the rights of teachers and other students, but not at non-school-sponsored events, and the district cannot exceed its authority to forbid or punish on-campus activity when punishing off-campus activity.
It should come as a shock to the parents of five high school seniors that their elected school board had assumed [control] over their children before and after school, off school grounds, and with regard to their children's rights [of] expressing their thoughts ... We trust that it will come as no shock to the school board that their assumption of authority is an unconstitutional  of the First Amendment.

See also

List of school districts in Texas

References

External links
 North East ISD

 
School districts in Bexar County, Texas